Juan Vicente Matala (born 27 July 1969) is an Equatoguinean sprinter. He competed in the men's 200 metres at the 1992 Summer Olympics.

References

1969 births
Living people
Athletes (track and field) at the 1992 Summer Olympics
Equatoguinean male sprinters
Olympic athletes of Equatorial Guinea
Place of birth missing (living people)